Volunteer of the Year may refer to any of the following awards:

Estonian Volunteer of the Year
NSW Volunteer of the Year, by New South Wales, Australia
NFCB Volunteer of the Year, by National Federation of Community Broadcasters
Online Volunteer of the Year, by United Nations Volunteers
Champions Tour Volunteer of the Year
California Volunteer of the Year